The Northeastern United States, also referred to as the Northeast, the East Coast, or the American Northeast, is a geographic region of the United States. It is located on the Atlantic coast of North America, with Canada to its north, the Southern United States to its south, and the Midwestern United States to its west. The Northeast is one of the four regions defined by the U.S. Census Bureau for the collection and analysis of statistics. The United States Census Bureau defines the region as including nine U.S. states: Connecticut, Maine, Massachusetts, New Hampshire, New Jersey, New York, Pennsylvania, Rhode Island, and Vermont. Some definitions also include Maryland, Delaware, and the District of Columbia, and on rare occasions, West Virginia and Virginia. 

It is also home to the Northeast megalopolis, containing the metro areas for the cities of Boston, New York, and Philadelphia; the megalopolis makes up 67% of the region's total population of 57,609,148. The GDP of the region was $5.1 trillion dollars as of 2022 and contains some of the most developed states based on the Human Development Index, with every state besides Maine above the national average. It is also the densest populated region in the United States, with 320 people per square mile (830 people/km2).

History

Indigenous people

Anthropologists recognize the "Northeastern Woodlands" as one of the cultural regions that existed in the Western Hemisphere at the time of European colonists in the 15th and later centuries. Most did not settle in North America until the 17th century. The cultural area, known as the "Northeastern Woodlands", in addition to covering the entire Northeast U.S., also covered much of what is now Canada and others regions of what is now the eastern United States.

Among the many tribes that inhabited this area were those that made up the Iroquois nations and the numerous Algonquian peoples. In the United States of the 21st century, 18 federally recognized tribes reside in the Northeast. For the most part, the people of the Northeastern Woodlands, on whose lands European fishermen began camping to dry their codfish in the early 1600s, lived in villages, especially after being influenced by the agricultural traditions of the Ohio and Mississippi valley societies.

Colonial history

All of the U.S. states making up the Northeastern region were among the original Thirteen Colonies, though Maine and Vermont were part of other colonies before the United States became independent in the American Revolution. The two cultural and geographic regions that form parts of the Northeastern region have distinct histories. The first European explorer known to have explored the Atlantic shoreline of the Northeast since the Norse was Giovanni da Verrazzano in 1524. His ship La Dauphine explored the coast from what is now known as Florida to New Brunswick.

The first Europeans to settle New England were Pilgrims from England, who landed in present-day Massachusetts in 1620. The Pilgrims arrived on the ship Mayflower and founded Plymouth Colony so they could practice religion freely. Ten years later, a larger group of Puritans settled north of Plymouth Colony in Boston to form Massachusetts Bay Colony. In 1636, colonists established Connecticut Colony and Providence Plantations. Providence was founded by Roger Williams, who was banished by Massachusetts for his beliefs in freedom of religion, and it was the first colony to guarantee all citizens freedom of worship. Anne Hutchinson, who was also banished by Massachusetts, formed the town of Portsmouth. Providence, Portsmouth and two other towns (Newport and Warwick) consolidated to form the Colony of Rhode Island and Providence Plantations.

Henry Hudson explored the area of present-day New York in 1609 and claimed it for the Netherlands. His journey stimulated Dutch interest, and the area became known as New Netherland. In 1625, the city of New Amsterdam (the location of present-day New York City) was designated the capital of the province. The Dutch New Netherland settlement along the Hudson River and, for a time, the New Sweden settlement along the Delaware River divided the English settlements in the north and the south. In 1664, Charles II of England formally annexed New Netherland and incorporated it into the English colonial empire. The territory became the colonies of New York and New Jersey. New Jersey was originally split into East Jersey and West Jersey until the two were united as a royal colony in 1702.

New England played a prominent role in early American education. Starting in the 17th century, the larger towns in New England opened grammar schools, the forerunner of the modern high school. The first public school in the English colonies was the Boston Latin School, founded in 1635. In 1636, the colonial legislature of Massachusetts founded Harvard College, the oldest institution of higher learning in the United States.

In 1681, William Penn, who wanted to give Quakers a land of religious freedom, founded Pennsylvania and extended freedom of religion to all citizens. Penn strongly desired access to the sea for his Pennsylvania Province and leased what then came to be known as the "Lower Counties on the Delaware" from the Duke. Penn established representative government and briefly combined his two possessions under one General Assembly in 1682. However, by 1704 the Province of Pennsylvania had grown so large that their representatives wanted to make decisions without the assent of the Lower Counties and the two groups of representatives began meeting on their own, one at Philadelphia, and the other at New Castle, Delaware. Penn and his heirs remained proprietors of both and always appointed the same person Governor for their Province of Pennsylvania and their territory of the Lower Counties. The fact that Delaware and Pennsylvania shared the same governor was not unique. From 1703 to 1738, New York and New Jersey shared a governor. Massachusetts and New Hampshire also shared a governor for some time.

American Revolution 

The beginnings of the American Revolutionary War would be in the Northeast, specifically in Massachusetts. The Battles of Lexington and Concord in northeast of Boston would be the first military engagements between the Revolutionaries and the British. Many of the major battles of the revolution would be fought in the Northeast. The British would evacuate Boston in early-1776 and would move to capture New York City. The revolutionaries would be pushed to the Delaware River before suddenly moving forward against the British in the Battles of Trenton and Princeton. After a stalemate started between the British and American Revolutionaries starting in 1778 and would continue until the end of the war in 1783. The war would move to southern states and eventually conclude with the Battle of Yorktown in Virginia.

Formation of the United States of America 
The idea of an independent United States of America, with the designs of its government would be created primarily in the Northeast in a series of declarations, constitutions, and documents. The Continental Congresses would meet in Philadelphia, which would produce the Declaration of Independence and the Articles of Confederation. Following the American Revolution, the capital of the newly formed United States would move around in the states of Pennsylvania, New Jersey, and New York. It would remain in New York City from 1785 until 1790, when it would move to Philadelphia. It would finally move to a new location in Washington D.C. in 1800. The Constitutional Convention would be held in Philadelphia to draft the new United States Constitution in 1787. 6 of the first 13 states to ratify the new constitution would be in the Northeast, with the last of the original 13, Rhode Island, ratifying the constitution in 1790. Vermont would be admitted in 1791 as the 14th state. The first Congress would convene in Federal Hall in New York City in March 1789.

Early and mid-19th century 
Following the revolution the Northeast would see small skirmishes like the Whiskey Rebellion in western parts of Pennsylvania. Many northeastern states would continue trading with the British and other European powers. Tensions between the United States and Europe (specifically Britain) would sour in the lead up to the War of 1812. This would cause certain trade merchants to meet in Hartford to propose succeeding from the United States. The War of 1812 would see less fighting in the Northeast and instead more fighting in western and southern areas. A failed invasion of Canada and the occupation of Maine would be some of the major conflicts during the war. The war would end in 1815 and most of the Northeast has not seen any major conflict since then.

The start of the Industrial Revolution in the United States would be in Blackstone Valley in Rhode Island and Massachusetts, textile mills would quickly spread across New England. After the War of 1812, industry would boom in the Northeast in the early and middle parts of the 19th century. With the construction of railroad and canals crossing the northeast and the rise of western territories and resources from the south, the Northeast would see a many new industries arise and a large rise in population. Many of the costal cities would serve as ocean trade ports for American goods like New York, Philadelphia, or Boston. Cities like Buffalo, Pittsburgh, Rochester, or Syracuse would be settled and would start rising to become industrial centers. By 1860, New York City (current day boundaries) would hit one million in population. Due to the settlement of the Midwest and Great Plains, agriculture would collapse in the Mid-Atlantic and New England, with many farms being abandoned by the end of the century, returning to rural forest. 

Conflicts with the south over the spread of slavery would become a large factor in the start of the American Civil War, between the United States (western and Northeastern states) and the Confederacy (southeastern states). The admission of Maine as a free state in exchange for Missouri becoming a slave state as part of the Missouri Compromise in 1820 would settle the final boundaries of the Northeastern states. The Mason-Dixon line would be established as the border of slavery, following the border of Pennsylvania and Delaware/Maryland. Abolitionist movements would start in the Northeast and Midwest and would become prominent towards the mid-19th century, these groups advocated the shrinking or banning of slavery in the United States. Some Northeastern states still had small amounts of slaves into the 1850s, though some would ban it during the decade. The election of 1860 would lead to the start of the Civil War, with Southern states succeeding from the United States in late-1860 and early-1861. States like Maryland and Delaware would remain in the union, even with slavery still legal. For the first 2 years the eastern theater of the war would remain in Virginia and Maryland, but in 1863 the war would reach its northeastern most extent in Gettysburg, Pennsylvania. The Battle of Gettysburg is considered a turning point in the Civil War, seeing the end of the Confederate push northwards. While all Northeastern states would remain in the United States during the war, conflicts did arise, like the New York draft riots in 1863. The war would end in 1865 with the United States taking back control of Southern states.

Industrial Revolution and modern times 

Following the Civil War, the Northeast would see a large economic boom and would become one of the most industrialized regions in the world. Many technological innovation would be made in the Northeast during this time. The Second Industrial Revolution would see the northeast grow massively, even more so than before the Civil War. Many cities in the Northeast would explode in population, with cities like Philadelphia and New York climbing over 1 million people, while other cities like Buffalo, Boston, and Pittsburgh would rise above half a million during this time. New York City would eventually rise to become one of the largest cities in the world by 1900. With the American involvement in both World Wars, the Northeast would become a large base of war production, with the Brooklyn Naval Yard producing many navy ships. Many worker strikes would occur in the states, including the Homestead strike in 1892. Many of these cities would see a peak population and industrial output in the aftermath of World War 2 in the 1950s.

Starting in the 1950s and continuing into the 21st century, a large industrial decline in the Northeast would occur, resulting in a depopulation of many Northeastern cities, many of which have yet to recover in 2020. This led to the rise of programs of urban renewal and demolition of large parts of Northeastern cities during the mid and late 20th century. There has also been a large population shift to the Sun Belt states starting in the 1960s. New York state would lose its title as the most populated state to California, one of the Sun Belt states in the 1970s. Some Northeastern cities like New York have recovered from its decline in the mid-20th century. Many new information and service industries have risen in the northeast, which has led to a boom in the 21st century in some cities in the Northeast like Boston, New York, and Philadelphia. Some other cities like Hartford, Syracuse, and Buffalo still are declining though in the 21st century. Hurricane Sandy would impact much of the northeast in 2012, severely damaging much of the coast and causing flooding inland. The hurricane would directly impact New Jersey and would cause large amounts of flooding in New York City.

Although the first settlers of New England were motivated by religion, since the 21st century, New England had become one of the least religious parts of the United States. In a 2009 Gallup survey, less than half of residents in Vermont, New Hampshire, Maine and Massachusetts reported religion as an important part of their daily life. In a 2010 Gallup survey, less than 30% of residents in Vermont, New Hampshire, Maine, and Massachusetts reported attending church weekly, giving them the lowest church attendance among U.S. states.

Geography

The vast area from central Virginia to northern Maine, and from western Pennsylvania, from Pittsburgh in the west to the Atlantic Ocean in the east, have all been loosely grouped into the Northeast.

Using the U.S. Census Bureau's definition of the Northeast, the region includes nine states: Maine, New York, New Jersey, Vermont, Massachusetts, Rhode Island, Connecticut, New Hampshire, and Pennsylvania. The region is often subdivided into New England (the six states east of New York State) and the Mid-Atlantic states (New York, New Jersey, and Pennsylvania). This definition has been essentially unchanged since 1880 and is widely used as a standard for data tabulation. However, the U.S. Census Bureau has acknowledged the obvious limitations of this definition and the potential merits of a proposal created after the 1950 census, that would include changing regional boundaries to include Delaware, Maryland, and the District of Columbia with the Mid-Atlantic states, but ultimately decided that "the new system did not win enough overall acceptance among data users to warrant adoption as an official new set of general-purpose state groupings. The previous development of many series of statistics, arranged and issued over long periods of time on the basis of the existing State groupings, favored the retention of the summary units of the current regions and divisions." The U.S. Census Bureau confirmed in 1994 that it would continue to "review the components of the regions and divisions to ensure that they continue to represent the most useful combinations of states and state equivalents."

Many organizations and reference works follow the Census Bureau's definition for the region. In the history of the United States, the Mason–Dixon line between Pennsylvania (the North) and Maryland (the South) traditionally divided the regions, but in modern times, various entities define the Northeastern United States in somewhat different ways. The Association of American Geographers divides the Northeast into two divisions: "New England", which is the same as the Census Bureau; and it has the same "Middle States" but adds Delaware. Similarly, the Geological Society of America defines the Northeast as these same states but with the addition of Maryland and the District of Columbia. The narrowest definitions include only the states of New England. Other more restrictive definitions include New England and New York as part of the Northeast United States, but exclude Pennsylvania and New Jersey.

States beyond the Census Bureau definition are included in Northeast Region by various other entities:

 Various organizations include: Delaware, Maryland and District of Columbia.
 The US EPA and NOAA include in their Northeast Region: Delaware, Maryland and West Virginia.
 The National Fish and Wildlife Service includes in their Northeast Region: Delaware, Maryland, District of Columbia, West Virginia, and Virginia.
 The National Park Service includes in their Northeast Region: Delaware, Maryland, West Virginia, and Virginia (though small parts are also in the National Capital Region).

Environment

Topography 
While most of the Northeastern United States lie in the Appalachian Highlands physiographic region; some are also part of the Atlantic coastal plain, which extends south to the southern tip of Florida. The coastal plain areas include Cape Cod in Massachusetts, Long Island in New York, and most of New Jersey, and are generally low and flat, with sandy soil and marshy land.

Land use 
, forest-use covered approximately 60% of the Northeastern states (including Delaware, Maryland and the District of Columbia), about twice the national average. About 11% was cropland and another 4% grassland pasture or range. There is also more urbanized land in the Northeast (12%) than any other region in the U.S.

Many parks on a state and national level cover the inland parts of the region. Large parks include the Adirondack Park in northeastern New York, Green Mountain National Forest in Vermont, White Mountain Forest in northern New Hampshire, Baxter State Park in northern Maine, Acadia National Park on the eastern coast of Maine, Allegheny National Forest in northwestern Pennsylvania, and Catskill Park in southern New York. There are also some parks closer to the shore, though these are usually smaller and squeezed in-between urbanized areas. These include the Palisades Park in New Jersey, Fire Island in Long Island, and the Cape Cod shoreline in Massachusetts.

Climate 
The climate of the Northeastern United States varies from northernmost Maine to southernmost Maryland. The climate of the region is created by the position of the general west to east flow of weather in the middle latitudes that much of the USA is controlled by and the position and movement of the subtropical highs. Summers are normally warm in northern areas to hot in southern areas. In summer, the building Bermuda High pumps warm and sultry air toward the Northeast, and frequent (but brief) thundershowers are common on hot summer days. In winter the subtropical high retreats southeastward, and the polar jet stream moves south bringing colder air masses from up in Canada and more frequent storm systems to the region. Winter often brings both rain and snow as well as surges of both warm and cold air.

The basic climate of the Northeast can be divided into a colder and snowier interior (western Maryland, most of Pennsylvania, most of northern New Jersey, Upstate New York, and most of New England), and a milder coast and coastal plain from Cape Cod and southern Rhode Island southward, including Long Island, Southern Connecticut, New York City, central and southern New Jersey, Delaware, and most of Maryland. In the latter region the hardiness zones are 7a and 7b. Annual mean temperatures range from the low-to-mid 50s F from Maryland to southern Connecticut, to the 40s F in most of New York State, New England, and northern Pennsylvania.

Most of the Northeast has a humid continental climate (Dfa/Dfb/Dc). The northernmost portion of the humid subtropical zone (Cfa/Do) begins at Martha's Vineyard and extreme SW Rhode Island and extends southwestward down the coastal plain to central and southern Maryland. The oceanic climate zone (Cfb/Do) only exists on Block Island and Nantucket and is the only area of the Northeast where all months average between 0 and 22 °C (32 and 71.6 °F).

Demographics

As of the 2020 United States census, the population of the region totaled 57,609,148, which is 17.38% of the total United States population. With an average of 345.5 people per square mile, the Northeast is 2.5 times as densely populated as the second-most dense region, the South. Since the last century, the U.S. population has been shifting away from the Northeast and Midwest toward the South and West.

The region's racial make up in 2020 was 64.42% white, 11.51% African American, 0.51% Native American, 7.25% Asian, 0.04% Pacific Islander, 8.17% from other races, and 8.10% from two or more races. Hispanic or Latino of any race were 15.27% of the population. There were 22,418,883 households and 14,189,719 families in 2021. Of the 22,418,883 households, 27.7% included children under the age of 18. 

In 2021, the region's the population's age distribution was 20.5% under age 18, 57.36% from 18 to 62, and 22.1% who were 62 years of age or older. The median age was 40.5 years. For every 100 females, there were 96.4 males. For every 100 women ages 18 and over, there were 94.3 men.

The median income for a household in the region in 2021 was $77,142, and the median income for a family was $97,347. About 11.9% of the population were below the poverty line, including 16.0% of those under age 18 and 10.4% of those age 65 or over.

The two U.S. Census Bureau divisions in the Northeast, New England and the Mid-Atlantic, rank second and first respectively among the 9 divisions in population density according to the 2013 population estimate. The South Atlantic region (233.1) was very close behind New England (233.2). Due to the faster growth of the South Atlantic region, it will take over the #2 division rank in population density in the next estimate, dropping New England to 3rd position. New England is projected to retain the number 3 rank for many, many years, as the only other lower-ranked division with even half the population density of New England is the East North Central division (192.1) and this region's population is projected to grow slowly.

Economy
 
, the Northeast U.S. accounts for approximately 23% of the nation's gross domestic product. Due to its vast population and diverse landscapes, the Northeast has a large and robust economy, ranging from financial services in Lower Manhattan, to agriculture in Central Pennsylvania.

New York City 

, the New York metropolitan area is estimated to produce a gross metropolitan product (GMP) of $2.1 trillion US dollars, ranking it first in the U.S. If the New York metropolitan area were a sovereign state, it would have the eighth-largest economy in the world. Manhattan is considered the world's financial center, with many large banks based in Lower Manhattan and some of the largest stock exchanges on Wall Street, like the New York Stock Exchange, it is so prominent that the term "Wall Street" is usually synonymous with finance. Many other companies are based in New York City area, either in Midtown Manhattan, downtown Brooklyn, Long Island City, or the various suburbs, like Stamford or White Plains. Some of the largest companies based in New York City area include, Verizon, J.P. Morgan Chase, Citigroup, MetLife, PepsiCo, IBM, Time Warner, Goldman Sachs, and Pfizer. Many tech companies are being founded as well in New York, or moving their headquarters in New York from other places, with the rise of many technology companies in the metropolitan area.

The large population of New York City and the metropolitan area around it contribute to a very large shopping economy, with many large shopping malls and department stores based in the area, including the Macy's on 34th street, Fifth Avenue, and various suburban shopping malls, like the American Dream in East Rutherford, Palisades Center in West Nyack, or the SoNo Collection in Norwalk. One of the largest cargo ports in the nation, the Port of New York and New Jersey, is located on New York Harbor, delivering goods for the city and much of the Northeast.

Other regions 

, the Philadelphia metropolitan area is estimated to produce a GMP of $479 billion US dollars, making it the 9th largest economy in the United States. Many large companies are based as well in Philadelphia due to its significance and easy connections to other cities like New York and Washington DC. These companies include Comcast, Cigna, and RiteAid. The Philadelphia Mint is also located within the city.

The Boston metropolitan area is also a major center for insurance, finance, and technology, with major companies like General Electric and Liberty Mutual being based in the city.

Rural regions and state, like Northern New York, Vermont, New Hampshire, and Maine rely more on agriculture, logging, mining, and tourism to help boost their local and statewide economies. Many national and state parks in the region generate lots of tourism, especially during fall months. The logging industry is especially prominent in Maine, making up a large part of Northern Maine's economy.

Many of the northeastern states have very large economies and are highly developed, including Connecticut, Massachusetts, New York, New Jersey, and Pennsylvania. These statics are as of Q3 2022.

 New York, US$2.1 trillion, per capita $105,226
 Pennsylvania, US$931 billion, per capita $71,825
 New Jersey, US$753 billion, per capita $81,307
 Massachusetts, US$693 billion, per capita $99,274
 Connecticut, US$323 billion, per capita $89,301
 New Hampshire, US$106 billion, per capita $76,008
 Maine, US$85 billion, per capita $61,491
 Rhode Island, US$72 billion per capita $65,879
 Vermont, US$41 billion, per capita $63,275

The Nuclear Regulatory Commission oversees 34 nuclear reactors, eight for research or testing and 26 for power production in the Northeastern United States.

Transportation

Rail systems

The Northeast is served by Amtrak trains, with the Northeast Regional and Acela, two of the busiest intercity rail lines in the United States going from Washington DC to Boston. Other Amtrak Lines that serve the Northeast include the Downeaster, Empire Service, Vermonter, Lake Shore Limited, Pennsylvanian. Many other rail systems also exist in the Northeast, varying from light rail, commuter rail, or heavy rapid transit (subway).

Major stations 

 30th Street Station in Philadelphia. Served by all SEPTA Regional Lines, Amtrak, NJ Transit's Atlantic City Line, it is the third busiest Amtrak station and 11th busiest train station in North America with over 4 million passengers in 2019.
 Pennsylvania Station in New York City. Served by some Northern NJ Transit lines, some Long Island Railroad trains (was all until January 2023) and Amtrak trains. It is the busiest train station in North America, with over 10 million passengers in 2019, along with 27 million passengers from NJ Transit and 69 million from Long Island Rail in 2017.
 Grand Central Terminal in New York City. Served by Metro North and some Long Island Rail trains (starting in January 2023). It had over 67 million annual passengers in 2017 and was the third busiest train station in North America.
 Union Station in New Haven. Served by New Haven Line, Hartford Line, and Shoreline East alongside Amtrak. It had 350,000 annual Amtrak passengers in 2017.
 South Station in Boston. Served by southern MBTA commuter lines and Amtrak, it was the 7th busiest train station in North America in 2017, with nearly 29 million passengers.
 North Station in Boston. Served by northern MBTA commuter lines and the Downeaster (Amtrak). It had 6 million MBTA users in 2012 and 152,000 Amtrak passengers in 2021.

Airports

The following table includes all airports categorized by the FAA as large or medium hubs located in the Northeastern states

Road 
Many major highways cross the Northeast, connecting it to the rest of the nation.

Many other minor highways exist in the Northeast, connecting cities. Major US Routes which run through the Northeast include US 1, US 2, US 3, US 4, US 5, US 6, US 7, US 9, US 11, US 13, US 15, US 19, US 20, US 22, US 30, US 40, US 44, US 46, US 62, US 130, US 201, US 202, US 206, US 209, US 219, US 220, US 222, US 224, US 302, US 322, US 422, US 522.

The Northeast has the highest amount of tolled roads/bridges in the nation with only two states in the Northeast having no tolls, Connecticut and Vermont. Notable turnpikes include the Pennsylvania Turnpike (I-76/I-276/I-95), New Jersey Turnpike (partially I-95), New York Thruway (I-87/I-90), Massachusetts Turnpike (I-90), Maine Turnpike (I-95), PA Turnpike Northeast Extension (I-476). The northeast also contains many tolled and non-tolled parkways, many of which are in New York City metro. Major parkways include the Garden State Parkway, Taconic State Parkway, Hutchinson River Parkway, Saw Mill River Parkway, Lake Ontario State Parkway, Niagara Scenic Parkway, Belt Parkway, Grand Central Parkway, Northern State Parkway.

Major crossings 

 Delaware Memorial Bridge (I-295, NJ Turnpike) - Crosses the Delaware River between Delaware and New Jersey, the southern most fixed crossing on the river. Eastbound span opened in 1951, westbound span opened in 1968.
 Walt Whitman Bridge (I-76) - Crosses the Delaware River, connecting southern Philadelphia to southern New Jersey suburbs. Opened in 1957.
 Benjamín Franklin Bridge (I-676) - Connects downtown Philadelphia with Camden, New Jersey and southern New Jersey. Opened in 1926.
 Delaware River Turnpike Toll Bridge (I-95, PA Turnpike) - Connects the PA Turnpike to the NJ Turnpike. I-95 was only designated in 2018, formerly was I-276. Opened in 1956.
 Newark Bay Bridge (I-76, NJ Turnpike) - Crosses Newark Bay, connecting Newark to Jersey City and Bayonne. Opened in 1956.
 Bayonne Bridge (NJ 440/NY 440) - Crosses Arthur Kill, connecting Bayonne to Staten Island, New York. Opened in 1931, raised in 2017.
 Verrazzano Narrows Bridge (I-278) - Crosses New York Harbor to connect Staten Island to Brooklyn, double decked. Opened in 1964.
 Brooklyn-Battery Tunnel (I-478) - Crosses underneath the East River to connect Lower Manhattan to Brooklyn. Opened in 1950.
 Brooklyn Bridge, Manhattan Bridge, Williamsburg Bridge - The bridges cross the East River to connect Lower Manhattan to Brooklyn. Opened in 1883, 1909, and 1903.
 PATH Hudson Tubes - Carries the PATH metro trains underneath the Hudson River to connect Newark, Jersey City, and Hoboken to Lower and Midtown Manhattan. The tubes opened up in 1908/1909.
 Holland Tunnel (I-78) - Crosses underneath the Hudson River, connects road traffic from Jersey City and Newark to Lower Manhattan. Opened in 1927.
 Queens-Midtown Tunnel (I-495) - Crosses underneath the East River, connecting the Long Island Expressway to Manhattan. Opened in 1940.
 North River Tunnels (NJ Transit, Amtrak) Carries the Northeast Corridor underneath the Hudson River, connecting rail traffic from New Jersey to Pennsylvania Station and New England. Opened in 1910.
 Lincoln Tunnel (NJ 495) - Crosses underneath the Hudson River to connect New Jersey to Midtown Manhattan. Opened in 1937.
 Queensboro Bridge (NY 25) - Connects Midtown Manhattan to Long Island City. Opened in 1909.
 Triborough Bridge (I-278) - Crosses the East River and Harlem River, provides road connections to Upper Manhattan, Queens, and the Bronx. Also crosses and connects Randalls Island. Opened in 1936.
 Hell Gate Bridge (Amtrak) - Crosses the East River and Bronx Kill, provides a rail connection from Pennsylvania Station to the Bronx and Connecticut. Opened in 1917.
 George Washington Bridge (I-95) - Crosses the Hudson River, connecting New York and New England to New Jersey and cross-country I-80. One of the busiest crossings in the United States. Double Decked. Opened in 1931.
 Alexander Hamilton Bridge (I-95) - Crosses the Harlem River, connecting Manhattan and the GW Bridge to the Cross Bronx Expressway. Opened in 1963. 
 Whitestone Bridge (I-678) - Crosses the East River, connecting South Bronx to Queens. Opened in 1939.
 Throgs Neck Bridge (I-295) Crosses the East River, connecting the Bronx and New England to the Queens and Long Island, northern most crossing of the East River. (no fixed crossings are in Long Island Sound) Opened in 1961.
 Tappan Zee Bridge (I-87, I-287) - Crosses the Hudson River, carrying NY Thruway and suburban traffic from Rockland and Westchester counties. Alternative to GW Bridge. Current span opened in 2017, former span opened in 1955.
 Newburgh-Beacon Bridge (I-84) - Crosses the Hudson River, carrying traffic from Pennsylvania and southeastern New York across the river to New England. Opened in 1963.
 Q Bridge (I-95) - Crosses the Quinnipiac River, carrying New Haven traffic along with traffic heading to New England or New York. Current span opened in 2012, original span opened in 1958. 
 Baldwin Bridge (I-95) - Crosses the Connecticut River, carrying cross-state traffic and connecting Old Saybrook to New London. Opened in 1948.
 Jamestown/Newport Pell Bridges (RI 138) - Crosses Narraganset Bay, connecting Newport, Rhode Island to the rest of the state. Jamestown Bridge opened in 1992, Newport Pell opened in 1969.
 Charter Oak Bridge (CT 15/US 5) - Crosses the Connecticut River, connecting southern Hartford and I-91 northbound to East Hartford and I-84 eastbound. Opened in 1991.
 Bulkeley Bridge (I-84) - Crosses the Connecticut River, connecting Hartford area traffic across the river. The oldest interstate crossing in the US. Opened in 1908.
 Ted Williams Tunnel (I-90) - Crosses underneath Boston Harbor. Connects the Mass Pike and I-93 to East Boston and Logan Airport. Opened in 1995/2003.
 Zakim Bridge (I-93) - Crosses the Charles River, carrying Boston traffic to the northern Massachusetts and Maine/New Hampshire. Opened in 2003.
 Piscataqua River Bridge (I-95) - Crosses the Piscataqua River, carrying traffic from New Hampshire and Massachusetts to Maine. Opened in 1972.
 Peace Bridge (QEW/I-190) - Crosses the Niagara River, carrying traffic from Buffalo, New York into Ontario. Opened in 1927.
 Rainbow Bridge (NY 384/NY 104) - Crosses the Niagara River, carrying traffic from Niagara Falls, New York into Niagara Falls, Ontario. Opened in 1941.
 Lewiston-Queenston Bridge (I-190) Crosses the Niagara River, carrying traffic from Buffalo, New York into Ontario. Opened in 1962.

History 

The Northeast has been a place for many firsts in transportation in the US, from the first commercial railroad in the US in Milton, Massachusetts (Granite Railway), first rapid transit system (MBTA Green Line), the first limited access road was the Bronx River Parkway, opened in 1922, New York is also where the first urban freeway was built in the late-1930s. (FDR Drive) The northeast would also be home to some of the first major freeway revolts in Greenwich Village, and would see the first major highway teardown (Miller Highway) in the 1970s.

Before European settlement, most of the Northeast was loosely connected by Native American trails, some of which would be incorporated into early-European settlement roads and turnpikes. One major early road was the Boston Post Road, connecting New York City and Boston along the Connecticut and Rhode Island coasts. Later these roads would be included in the King's Highway, spanning most of the east coast. Smaller turnpikes would also connect cities across the northeast. These roads would prove essential to moving goods across the English colonies in the 18th century and would later play a large part in the American Revolution.

The region would a boom in canals built in the early-19th century, with a major canal being the Erie Canal, opened in 1825, connecting the Great Lakes to the Hudson River and Atlantic Ocean through Western New York. The first railroads would be built in the late-1820s and would explode in mileage in the mid to late 19th century. Places like Philadelphia, New York, Boston, Newark, and Pittsburgh would become large water and rail hubs during the Industrial Revolution and would see tremendous booms in population and use.

Many large rivers in the northeast like the Hudson and Delaware would be slowly crossed with bridges starting in the 1800s, with the first fixed crossing of the Hudson River south of Albany being the Poughkeepsie Railroad Bridge, opened in 1889. The Delair Bridge, which would connect Philadelphia with New Jersey was opened six years later in 1896. The first crossing of the Hudson River into New York City would be the series of Hudson River PATH tunnels, being opened in 1908 and 1909. The first major vehicle tunnel would be the Holland Tunnel, opened up in 1927.

The start of highway construction would be the Bronx River Parkway and Long Island Motor Parkway, both of which started construction in the early-1900s. The rise of Robert Moses in New York would see the construction of many major road bridges and highways crossing the city and metro area. East River Drive (eventually renamed FDR Drive), was built along the corresponding river in Manhattan. The mid-20th century would see the rise of urban and suburban freeways and the decline of passenger and freight rail, with many lesser used tracks being abandoned or torn up during this time. It would also see the original Pennsylvania Station demolished in Midtown Manhattan during the mid-1960s. The construction of the Cross-Bronx Expressway in New York, Central Artery in Boston, and the Vine Street Expressway in Philadelphia tore up many ethnic and minority neighborhoods in the name of urban renewal. Many other highways were proposed during this era, like the Lower Manhattan Expressway and the Inner Belt in Boston, which were not built due to fierce highway revolts and rising costs. After the major highway revolts and rise of environmental concerns, new highway and interstate projects were mostly cancelled or shortened in the Northeast by the 1990s.

Despite the lack of new major road projects in the Northeast, the region has still continued to grow in population, resulting in the rise of alternative forms of transport like HOV lanes or commuter rails. This has led to the Northeast having one of the highest transit usage percentages in North America, with the Long Island Railroad being the most used commuter rail in the continent. One exception was the Big Dig, a major road project that would tear down the former elevated Central Artery (I-93) and instead tunnel it (and widen). It would also construct a new Charles River bridge and the Ted Williams Tunnel (I-90). This would end up becoming one of the costliest construction projects in the world, costing $21 billion adjusted to 2020 inflation. The former highway's path would become the Rose Kennedy Greenway, a large public park. The Sheridan Expressway (former I-895) was also rebuilt into a boulevard in the late-2010s. Rochester, New York has torn down the Inner Loop due to low traffic and to reunify neighborhoods in downtown and to create developable space.

Culture 

One geographer, Wilbur Zelinsky, asserts that the Northeast region lacks a unified cultural identity, but has served as a "culture hearth" for the rest of the nation. Several much smaller geographical regions within the Northeast have distinct cultural identities.

Landmarks
Almost half of the National Historic Landmarks maintained by the National Park Service are located in the Northeastern United States.

Religion
According to a 2009 Gallup poll, the Northeastern states differ from most of the rest of the U.S. in religious affiliation, generally reflecting the descendants of immigration patterns of the late 19th and early 20th centuries, with many Catholics arriving from Ireland, Italy, French Canada - Quebec, Portugal and east-central Europe. Massachusetts, Rhode Island, New York and New Jersey are the only states in the nation where Catholics outnumber Protestants and other Christian denominations. More than 20% of respondents in Maine, New Hampshire, and Vermont declared no religious identity. Compared to other U.S. regions, the Northeast, along with the Pacific Northwest, has had the lowest regular religious service attendance and the fewest people for whom religion is an important part of their daily lives as of 2015.

Sports
The Northeast region is home to numerous professional sports franchises in the "Big Four" leagues (NFL, NBA, NHL and MLB), with more than 100 championships collectively among them.
 New York metropolitan area: Giants, Jets (NFL), Yankees, Mets (MLB), Knicks, Nets (NBA), Rangers, Islanders, Devils (NHL)
 Philadelphia: Eagles (NFL), Phillies (MLB), 76ers (NBA), Flyers (NHL)
 Boston: Patriots (NFL), Red Sox (MLB), Celtics (NBA), Bruins (NHL)
 Pittsburgh: Steelers (NFL), Pirates (MLB), Penguins (NHL)
 Buffalo: Bills (NFL), Sabres (NHL)

Major League Soccer features four Northeastern teams: New England Revolution, New York City FC, New York Red Bulls and Philadelphia Union. The region also has two WNBA teams: Connecticut Sun and New York Liberty.

Notable golf tournaments in the Northeastern United States include The Northern Trust, Travelers Championship, and Atlantic City LPGA Classic. The US Open, held in New York, is one of the four Grand Slam tennis tournaments.

Notable Northeastern motorsports tracks include Watkins Glen International, Pocono Raceway, New Hampshire Motor Speedway and Lime Rock Park, which have hosted Formula One, IndyCar, NASCAR and International Motor Sports Association races. Also, drag strips such as Englishtown, Epping and Reading have hosted NHRA national events. Belmont Park at New York hosts the Belmont Stakes horse races, which is part of the Triple Crown of Thoroughbred Racing.

The region has also been noted for the prevalence of the traditionally Northeastern sports of ice hockey and lacrosse.

Politics

The Northeastern United States tended to vote Republican in federal elections through the first half of the 20th century, but the region has since the 1990s shifted to become the most Democratic in the nation. Results from a 2008 Gallup poll indicated that eight of the top ten Democratic states were located in the region, with every Northeastern state having a Democratic Party affiliation advantage of at least ten points. The following table demonstrates Democratic support in the Northeast as compared to the remainder of the nation.

The following table of United States presidential election results since 1920 illustrates that over the past seven presidential elections, only three Northeastern states supported a Republican candidate (New Hampshire voted for George W. Bush in 2000; Pennsylvania and Maine's 2nd congressional district voted for Donald Trump in 2016). 2004 is so far the only election in U.S. history in which the winner did not win any northeastern state. Bolded entries indicate that party's candidate also won the general election.

The following table shows the breakdown of party affiliation of governors, attorneys general, state legislative houses and U.S. congressional delegation for the Northeastern states, . (Demographics reflect registration-by-party figures from that state's registered voter statistics.)

See also
 Atlantic Northeast
 Jersey Shore
 New England–Acadian forests
 Northeast Corridor
 Northeast megalopolis
 Northeastern coastal forests
 Rust Belt

Notes

References

External links 

 
Demographic history of the United States
Census regions of the United States